FIMC may stand for:

Fellowship of Independent Methodist Churches, a Methodist connexion in the conservative holiness movement
Fujairah International Marine Club, a recreational boating club